Template is a Canadian science fiction novel by Matthew Hughes, published by PS Publishing.  It follows the adventures of a professional duelist who is drawn into a murder mystery.  The novel explores differences between various cultures.

Reception
Matthew Hughes has been called one of Canada's best science fiction writers and his novel Template has been considered to be one of his best novels.

Another review noted that this novel is part detective story, part space opera and part investigation into the clash of cultures.

References

External links 

2008 science fiction novels
Canadian science fiction novels
PS Publishing books